Glenys Margaret Elaine Hanna-Martin (née Hanna; born 27 October 1958) is a Bahamian Progressive Liberal Party politician and lawyer serving as Minister of Education since 2021. She has been the Member of Parliament (MP) for Englerston since 2002, making her the country's longest serving female parliamentarian.

In 2008, Hanna-Martin became the first woman to hold the position of Chairman of a political party in The Bahamas. She was the Minister of Transport and Aviation from 2002 to 2007 and 2012 to 2017.

Early life
Glenys Hanna was born in Nassau on to the Hon. Arthur Dion Hanna and Beryl Hanna (née Church).

Her education began at St. Anne's School, Fox Hill. She later attended Queen's College, and matriculated from Padworth College, Reading, England. She continued her studies at York University, Toronto, Ontario, graduating in 1981 with a Bachelor of Arts (Specialized Honours) Degree in English Literature. In 1985 she left for the University of Buckingham, England where she obtained her LL.B with top honours having been awarded the Maxwell Law Prize by the institution.

Hanna Martin joined the Inner Temple, London and in 1988, after having successfully completed her Council of Legal Education Course, was called to the Bar of England and Wales, and The Bahamas bar.

Career
In 1998, Hanna-Martin became Chairperson of the Women's Branch of the Progressive Liberal Party. She originally ran for the Holy Cross constituency against Carl Bethel.

Hanna Martin ran again in 2002, this time in the Englerston constituency and was elected to the Assembly. In 2008, she was elected Chairman of the Progressive Liberal Party at its National Convention, becoming the first female to hold the post of Chairman of any major political party in The Bahamas. She served as Minister of Transport and Aviation in both Perry Christie governments. She was previously Chair of the Bahamas Branch and immediate past Regional Representative of the Commonwealth Parliamentary Women's Association.

Hanna-Martin was one of four PLP candidates to win or retain their seat in the 2017 general election. Now in her fifth term, she is the longest serving female Parliamentarian in the Party's history. She was also the first woman to run for the PLP leadership. When the PLP won in 2021, she was appointed Minister of Education, Technical and Vocational Training under Philip Davis.

Personal life
Hanna-Martin was married to Leon "Onni" Martin for thirty years until his death in 2013. She is the mother of three and grandmother of two.

References

Members of the Parliament of the Bahamas
Living people
Government ministers of the Bahamas
1958 births
Progressive Liberal Party politicians
People from Nassau, Bahamas
Women government ministers of the Bahamas
21st-century Bahamian women politicians
21st-century Bahamian politicians
People educated at Padworth College
20th-century Bahamian women politicians
20th-century Bahamian politicians